"If Only You" is the third single from the album Heart Beats by Danny Saucedo.  It features Therese on the radio version which was released in early August.

On August 8, 2007, Danny & Therese sang "If Only You" at Sommarkrysset 2007 that was aired on TV4.

The single peaked at number three on the Swedish Singles Chart.

Track listings 
 If Only You (Radio Version ft. Therese)
 If Only You (Original Version)
 If Only You (Extended Version ft. Therese)

Charts

Weekly charts

Year-end charts

2011 release in the UK and video, with Freja 
The song was released in the UK during summer 2011, with Freja replacing Therese. A music video was shot for its release.

References 

2007 singles
Songs written by Vincent Pontare
Sony Music singles
Songs written by Michel Zitron
Danny Saucedo songs